NeuN (Fox-3, Rbfox3, or Hexaribonucleotide Binding Protein-3), a protein which is a homologue to the protein product of a sex-determining gene in Caenorhabditis elegans, is a neuronal nuclear antigen that is commonly used as a biomarker for neurons.

History
NeuN was first described in 1992 by Mullen et al., who raised a series of monoclonal antibodies to mouse antigens with the original intent of finding mouse species specific immunological markers for use in transplantation experiments. In the event they isolated a hybridoma line which produced a monoclonal antibody called mAb A60, which proved to bind an antigen expressed only in neuronal nuclei and to a lesser extent the cytoplasm of neuronal cells, and which appeared to work on all vertebrates. This antigen was therefore known as NeuN for "Neuronal Nuclei" though what the A60 antibody was binding to was unknown for the next 17 years. In 2009, Kim et al. used proteomic methods to show that NeuN corresponds to a protein known as Fox-3, also known as Rbfox3, a mammalian homologue of Fox-1, a protein originally identified from genetic studies of the nematode worm C. elegans.

Structure
Western blotting shows that mAb A60 binds to two bands of apparent molecular weight ~46kDa and ~48kDa on SDS-PAGE. These two bands are generated from a single Fox-3 gene by alternate splicing. There are in fact four protein products from the Fox-3 gene as a result of the presence or absence of two amino acid sequences coded by two exons. The inclusion or absence of 47 amino acids from exon 12 results in the ~46kDa and ~48kDa bands seen on SDS-PAGE gels, while the inclusion or absence of 14 amino acids from exon 15 produces two forms which are too similar in molecular size to be discerned on typical SDS-PAGE gels. Interestingly, the protein coded by exon 15 adds a C-terminal PY type nuclear localization sequence, which presumably explains why NeuN/Fox-3 protein can be both nuclear and, in some cell types, also cytoplasmic. All forms are expressed only in neurons so the mAb A60 antibody and other similar antibodies to NeuN/Fox-3 have become very widely used as robust markers of neurons.

Uses as a Neuronal Biomarker
NeuN antibodies are widely used to label neurons, despite some shortcomings, and a January 2023 Pubmed search using the keyword "NeuN" produced 4200 hits. A few neuronal cell types are not recognized by NeuN antibodies, such as Purkinje cells, stellate and Golgi cells of the cerebellum, olfactory Mitral cells, retinal photoreceptors and spinal cord gamma motor neurons. However the vast majority of neurons are strongly NeuN positive, and NeuN immunoreactivity has been widely used to identify neurons in tissue culture and in sections and to measure the neuron/glia ratio in brain regions. NeuN immunoreactivity becomes obvious as neurons mature, typically after they have downregulated expression of Doublecortin, a marker seen in the earliest stages of neuronal development.

Feminizing Locus on X Homologue
Fox-3 is one of a family of mammalian homologues of the Fox-1 protein, originally discovered in the nematode worm C. elegans as the protein product of a gene involved in sex determination. Fox is, in fact, an acronym of "Feminizing locus on X". The mammalian genome contains three genes homologous to C. elegans Fox-1, called Fox-1, Fox-2 and Fox-3. The Fox proteins are all about 46kDa in size, and each includes a central, highly conserved ~70 amino acid RRM or RNA recognition motif. RRM domains are one of the most common in the human genome and are found in numerous proteins which bind RNA molecules. NeuN/Fox-3 and the other Fox proteins function in the regulation of mRNA splicing and bind specific RNA sequences. For a review of the Fox family of proteins see this reference. An alternate name for Fox-3 is hexaribonucleotide binding protein 3 since Fox-3, like Fox-2 and Fox-1, bind the hexaribonucleotide UGCAUG, this binding being involved in the regulation of mRNA splicing.

References 

Antibodies